Comedy of the Heart (German: Komödie des Herzens) is a 1924 German silent romance film directed by Rochus Gliese and starring Lil Dagover, Nigel Barrie and Alexander Murski. It premiered at the Tauentzienpalast in Berlin on 30 September 1924. It was based on a novella by Sophie Hoechstetter. The film was one of UFA's major releases of the 1923-1925 boom period. It was made at the Babelsberg Studio.

Cast
 Lil Dagover as Gerda Werska 
 Nigel Barrie as Baron Vinzenz 
 Alexander Murski as Graf Inger auf Ingersholm 
 Ruth Weyher as Inge 
 Colette Brettel as Daisy 
 Victor Palfi as Jurgen 
 Ernst Winar as Knud 
 Hans Cürlis as Herr Fips, Hauslehrer 
 Lydia Potechina as Frau Ring 
 William Huch   
 Robert Leffler

References

Bibliography
 Hardt, Ursula. From Caligari to California: Erich Pommer's life in the International Film Wars. Berghahn Books, 1996.
 Kreimeier, Klaus. The Ufa Story: A History of Germany's Greatest Film Company, 1918-1945. University of California Press, 1999.

External links

1924 films
Films of the Weimar Republic
1920s romance films
German silent feature films
German romance films
Films directed by Rochus Gliese
Films based on short fiction
German black-and-white films
Films produced by Erich Pommer
Films with screenplays by F. W. Murnau
UFA GmbH films
Films shot at Babelsberg Studios
1920s German films